Mayra Gisela Peñuelas Acuña (born 9 February 1963) is a Mexican politician from the Institutional Revolutionary Party. From 2006 to 2009 she served as Deputy of the LX Legislature of the Mexican Congress representing Sinaloa.

References

1963 births
Living people
People from Sinaloa
Women members of the Chamber of Deputies (Mexico)
Institutional Revolutionary Party politicians
21st-century Mexican politicians
21st-century Mexican women politicians
Deputies of the LX Legislature of Mexico
Members of the Chamber of Deputies (Mexico) for Sinaloa